Maths Week Ireland (MWI) is an all-island (Republic of Ireland and Northern Ireland) mathematics outreach initiative founded in 2006 by Eoin Gill and Sheila Donegan, based on an idea by Eoin Gill. It is a project of the Centre for the Advancement of Learning of Maths, Science and Technology (CALMAST) the STEM outreach centre at Waterford Institute of Technology. It is run by Gill and Donegan who are the directors of CALMAST. In 2019 MWI engaged over 400,000 people on an island with a population of under 7 million and is arguably the world's largest mathematics festival.

Purpose
MWI is a partnership of over 50 organizations dedicated to promoting and celebrating mathematics across the island of Ireland, including universities, institutes of technology, colleges, museums, libraries, visitor centres, and other professional bodies. Maths Week Ireland is supported by the Departments of Education in both parts of the island of Ireland, Science Foundation Ireland (SFI), the ESB Group, and various technology companies such as Google and Xilinx.

MWI targets school and universities, as well as hosting weekend "street fairs" in cities such as Dublin, Belfast and Cork. Events are run by the participants with materials delivered online by Maths Week Ireland. Most schools run their own special activities. Maths Week is a nine-day event (a Saturday to the Sunday of the following weekend, inclusive) which always includes the 16th of October, the day in 1843 when William R. Hamilton discovered quaternions. 
The idea has been so successful that it has now been replicated in England and Scotland.

MWI hosts the Maths Ireland website which is home to the monthly blogs of the Annals of Irish Mathematics & Mathematicians (AIMM), authored by Colm Mulcahy.

Starting in 2016, MWI has also produced the annual Irish Maths Calendars which are also archived at the Maths Ireland site.

Presenters
Mathematicians and mathematics popularizers who have been MWI presenters include:

 Rob Eastaway
 Marcus du Sautoy
 John D. Barrow
 Colm Mulcahy
 David Acheson
 Keith Devlin
 Matt Parker
 Eugenia Cheng
 James Tanton 
 Kjartan Poskitt
 Bobby Seagull

Maths Week Ireland Award
In 2016 MWI inaugurated the annual Maths Week Ireland Award to honor outstanding work in raising public awareness of mathematics. The award is presented during Maths Week Ireland.   Awardees so far are:
2016: Des MacHale
2017: Peter Lynch
2018: Anthony O’Farrell and Fiacre Ó Cairbre who founded the annual Hamilton Walk 
2019: Mark McCartney
2020: Aoibhinn Ní Shúilleabháin
2021: Dara Ó Briain
2022: Rafael de Andrade Moral

References

External links
 Maths Week Ireland Official Website

Mathematics conferences
Organizations established in 2006
Annual events in the Republic of Ireland
Annual events in Northern Ireland
Educational institutions established in the 20th century